The System Service Processor (often abbreviated as SSP) is a SPARC-based computer that is used to control the Sun Microsystems Enterprise 10000 platform.  The term SSP is often used to describe both the computer hardware and the software that are necessary to accomplish this task.

Functionality
The System Service Processor software provided for the following functionality:

 Environmental monitoring and automated domain-shutdown in the event of an out-of-bounds condition, such as a CPU getting too hot.
 The creation and destruction of domains
 The ability to boot domains
 Domain console device
 Dynamic Reconfiguration of domains, in which CPU, memory, and/or Input-Output boards are added to or removed from a running domain.
 Assign multiple paths to Input-Output devices for increased availability
 Monitor and display platform environmental statistics, such as the temperatures, currents, and voltages present on System Boards
 Monitor and control power flow to the platform components such as System Boards and Control Boards
 Power On Self Test and similar platform diagnostics
 Logging and Notification for various platform events
 The creation and destruction of Inter Domain Networks (IDNs) which allow for TCP/IP connectivity between domains, across the platform's centerplane.
 Support for a dual power-grid option

Several utilities were provided with the SSP software packages, including  hostview, a program that provided an X Window System interface for platform maintenance, and several CLI programs.

Implementation
Normally, two System Service Processors were used per platform.  One was configured as Main and the other as Spare. Only the SSP in the role of Main could control the platform at any given time. Failover between Main and Spare was performed automatically by the SSP software.

Supported hardware platforms
The following systems were supported for use as System Service Processors:

 Sun SPARCstation 5
 Sun Ultra 5
 Sun Enterprise 250
 Sun Netra T1

See also 
 Baseboard Management Controller
 IBM System Guard, a service processor on most RS/6000 machines
 Intel Management Engine

References
 Sun Enterprise 10000 SSP 3.5 User Guide, October 2001

External links
 Sun Enterprise 10000 SSP 3.5 Collection

Sun Microsystems hardware
Sun Microsystems software
SPARC microprocessor products